Heider is a German surname. It may be a habitation name for someone living on a heath, or a reference to a place-name with similar ultimate meaning. It is a variation of Haider.
Notable people with the surname include:

Fritz Heider (1896–1988), Austrian psychologist
Karl G. Heider (born 1935), American anthropologist
Karl Heider (zoologist) (1856–1935), Austrian zoologist and embryologist
Lee Heider (born 1947), American politician
Marc Heider (born 1986), American-born German footballer
Matthias Heider (born 1966), German politician
Moriz Heider (1816–1866), Austrian dentist
Paul Heider (1868–1936), Grand Master of the Teutonic Order
Robert R. Heider (1928–2015), American politician
Wally Heider (1923–1989), American audio engineer

See also
Haider (surname)

References

                   

German toponymic surnames